Fabian Schulze (born 7 March 1984 in Filderstadt, Baden-Württemberg) is a German pole vaulter.

Biography
He finished fifth at the 2005 European Indoor Athletics Championships in Madrid and fourth at the 2006 IAAF World Indoor Championships in Moscow and the 2006 IAAF World Athletics Final in Stuttgart.

His personal best jump is 5.81 metres, achieved in July 2006 in Ingolstadt. This ranks him seventh among German pole vaulters, behind Tim Lobinger, Andrei Tivontchik, Michael Stolle, Danny Ecker, Richard Spiegelburg and Lars Börgeling.

Competition record

See also
 Germany all-time top lists - Pole vault

External links

1984 births
Living people
People from Filderstadt
Sportspeople from Stuttgart (region)
German male pole vaulters